The American Presbyterian Church is a Presbyterian denomination, formed in 1979, by churches that separate from the Bible Presbyterian Church (BPC), for defending Exclusive Psalmody, alcohol abstinence and a premillennialist.

History 

In the 1970s, the Bible Presbyterian Church became tolerant of different positions on eschatology. Because of this, a group of churches split from the denomination for espousing a premillennial view. In addition, the separate churches split for advocating Exclusive Psalmody and Abstinence from Alcohol.

The denomination has slowly grown since its formation. In 2022, it was formed by 2 churches, which together had 60 members.

Doctrine 

The denomination subscribes to the Apostles' Creed, Nicene-Constantinopolitan Creed, the Westminster Confession of Faith, Westminster Larger Catechism and Westminster Shorter Catechism. It differs from other Presbyterians only in eschatology premillennialism, exclusive psalmody and abstinence from alcohol.

Interecclesiastical Relations 

The denomination has been an observer of the North American Presbyterian and Reformed Council.

References 

Presbyterian denominations in the United States
Presbyterian denominations established in the 20th century
Christian organizations established in 1979
Fundamentalist denominations